Denticetopsis iwokrama is a species of whale catfish endemic to Guyana where it is only known from the type locality in the Siparuni River basin.  This species grows to a length of 4.3 cm (1.7 inches).

References 
 

Cetopsidae
Catfish of South America
Endemic fauna of Guyana
Fish of Guyana
Fish described in 2005